Two Rainy Nights is a 2002 live album by Joe Jackson. Initially available on his own Great Big Island label only from Jackson's website, it was subsequently released on CD. The album is a combination of newer songs and older material, recorded at performances in Seattle WA and Portland OR in April 2001.

Track listing
All songs written and arranged by Joe Jackson.

Personnel
 Musicians
 Joe Jackson – piano, keyboards, melodica, vocals
 Catherine Bent - percussion, cello
 Allison Cornell - violin, keyboards, vocals
 Andy Ezrin - keyboards
 Sue Hadjopoulos - percussion
 Graham Maby - bass, vocals
 Roberto Juan Rodriguez - drums

 Production
 Joe Jackson - arrangements, producer
 Sheldon Steiger - recording engineer, mixing

References

External links 
 Two Rainy Nights album information at The Joe Jackson Archive

Joe Jackson (musician) live albums
2002 live albums
E1 Music live albums